Antaeotricha tectoria is a moth of the family Depressariidae. It is found in Guyana, French Guiana and Brazil.

The wingspan is 32–33 mm. The forewings are ochreous-whitish with the dorsal three-fifths pale ochreous-grey and with a trapezoidal blotch of dark grey suffusion on the dorsum about two-thirds, not reaching half across the wing. The hindwings are grey.

References

Moths described in 1915
tectoria
Moths of South America